Real Jaén Club de Fútbol, S.A.D. is a Spanish football team based in Jaén, in the autonomous community of Andalusia. Founded in 1929 it plays in Tercera División RFEF, holding home matches at Nuevo Estadio de La Victoria, with a capacity of 12,569 spectators. The club's biggest achievement has been playing 3 seasons in La Liga, the Spanish top tier, during the 1950s.

History
The club was founded in 1929 as Sociedad Olímpica Jiennense, and in 1947 it changed its name to Real Jaén Club de Fútbol. The team did not enroll in a national division until 1943 when it promoted to the Tercera Division. It immediately became a dominant team in the Spanish third division usually finishing in the top four.

After nine seasons in the Tercera Division, the "Lizards" were promoted to the Segunda Division in 1952. Their good form continued in the second division, as Real Jaén managed to win the 1952–53 Segunda Division group south, and managed to promote to La Liga for the first time ever. They won all of their home games that season including a 9–0 home win over fellow Andalusians Granada CF.

During Real Jaén's first ever season in the Spanish top tier (1953–54) the team finished 14th with 11 wins, 6 draws, and 13 defeats, meaning they obtained 28 points. This meant the team would be placed in the relegation group along with CA Osasuna and four teams from the Segunda Division. Jaén finished in last place with only one win and were relegated after just one season in the Spanish top flight.

Following their relegation from La Liga in 1954, key players departed from the team and Jaén finished in 7th place the following season. The next season was a lot better for Jaén. They managed to win the group South of Segunda Division, this time in the season 1955–56. This meant that La Liga again awaited the Real Jaén.

In their second top flight season, Jaén barely avoided relegation, finishing 14th, one point above relegated Deportivo de La Coruña. Jaén managed to stay in the Spanish elite. Their third top flight season was less successful and the team finished last with only 20 points collected. Real Jaén was relegated after two years in La Liga. The biggest highlight of the season was probably when Jaén managed a 1–0 home win over powerhouse FC Barcelona.

Following their second top flight relegation, Real Jaén never managed to compete for a return to the elite. Their best season was 1959–60, when the team managed a 3rd place finish coming up two points behind the second placed Cordoba CF, which qualified the team for the promotion playoffs. Following the 1962–63 season, the "Lizards" were relegated to the Tercera Division. This was the first time the team played there since 1952.

For the following 12 seasons, Jaén only made one return to the Segunda, in 1967, but were immediately relegated. They managed to return to the second tier in 1976 and remained there for three seasons until 1979 when they were relegated to the newly created Segunda Division B, the new third tier in Spanish football. Jaén stayed in the third level until 1986, when the team was relegated to the Tercera Division, this time the fourth tier. They bounced between the Segunda B and the Tercera the following years.

In 1997, the team returned to the Segunda Division for the first time since 1979. The 1997–98 season was bad however, as they finished last and went back to the Segunda B. Real Jaén managed to return to the Segunda in 2000. They achieved a 10th place finish in the 2000–01 season, but finished last the following season and were relegated again. The following 11 seasons were spent in the Segunda B, until 2013, when Jaén again returned to the Segunda. The "Lizards" finished second to last, in 21st place, meaning relegation followed again.

In 2017, Jaén finished 19th in the Segunda B, and were relegated to the Tercera Division for the first time since 1991.

Here, being in the 4th level of the Spanish football, the club finished 3rd in the 2017–18 season and remained in that category. On July 5, 2019 Real Jaén presented Alberto González as a new coach for the 2019–20 season.

Season to season

3 seasons in La Liga
16 seasons in Segunda División
31 seasons in Segunda División B
28 seasons in Tercera División
2 seasons in Tercera Federación

Honours
 Segunda División
 Winners (2): 1952–53, 1955–56

 Segunda División B
 Winners (2): 1995–96, 2012–13

 Tercera División
 Winners (6): 1951–52, 1964–65, 1966–67, 1975–76, 1987–88, 2018–19

 Copa Federación
 Winners (2): 1951–52, 2008–09

Current squad

Famous players
Note: this list includes players that have appeared in at least 100 league games and/or have reached international status.

Women's football
Real Jaén was represented in the 2009–10 Superliga Femenina by FCF Atlético Jiennense.

References

External links

Official website 
Futbolme team profile 
Unofficial website 
La futbolteca team profile 

Real Jaén
Football clubs in Andalusia
Association football clubs established in 1929
1929 establishments in Spain
J
Sport in Jaén, Spain
Segunda División clubs
La Liga clubs